Eduardo Tomas Nova Bolanos (born 23 December 1955) is a Mexican politician affiliated with the PAN. As of 2012 he served as Senator of the LX and LXI Legislatures of the Mexican Congress representing Querétaro.

References

1952 births
Living people
Politicians from Michoacán
Politicians from Querétaro
Members of the Senate of the Republic (Mexico)
National Action Party (Mexico) politicians
20th-century Mexican politicians
21st-century Mexican politicians
Members of the Congress of Querétaro
National Autonomous University of Mexico alumni